Foday Saybana Sankoh (17 October 1937 – 29 July 2003) was the founder of the Sierra Leone rebel group Revolutionary United Front (RUF), which was supported by Charles Taylor-led NPFL in the 11-year-long Sierra Leone Civil War, starting in 1991 and ending in 2002. An estimated 50,000 people were killed during the war, and over 500,000 people were displaced in neighboring countries.

Early life and career
Foday Sankoh was born on 17 October 1937, in the remote village of Masang Mayoso, Tonkolili District in the Northern part of Sierra Leone to an ethnic Temne father and a Loko mother. Sankoh was the son of a farmer.

Sankoh attended primary and secondary school in Magburaka, Tonkolili District and took on a number of jobs in Magburaka before he joined the Sierra Leone army in 1956. He undertook training in Nigeria and the United Kingdom. In 1971, then a corporal in the Sierra Leone army, he was cashiered from the army's signal corps and imprisoned for seven years at the Pademba Road Prison in Freetown for taking part in a mutiny.

On his release he worked as an itinerant photographer in the south and east of Sierra Leone, eventually coming in contact with young radicals.

Sankoh and confederates Rashid Mansaray and Abu Kanu solicited support for an armed uprising to oust the APC government. They then traveled to Liberia, where they reportedly continued recruiting and served with Charles G. Taylor's National Patriotic Front of Liberia (NPFL).

Civil war

On 23 March 1991, the RUF, led by Foday Sankoh and backed by Charles Taylor, launched its first attack in villages in Kailahun District in the diamond-rich Eastern Province of Sierra Leone.

The RUF became notorious for brutal practices such as mass rapes and amputations during the civil war. Sankoh personally ordered many operations, including one called "Operation Pay Yourself" that encouraged troops to loot anything they could find. After complaining about such tactics, Kanu and Mansaray were summarily executed.

In March 1997, Sankoh fled to Nigeria, where he was put under house arrest and then imprisoned. From this time until Sankoh's release in 1999, Sam Bockarie performed the task of director of military operations of the RUF. During the ten-year war, Sankoh broke several promises to stop fighting, including the Abidjan Peace Accord and the Lomé Peace Accord signed in 1999. Eventually the United Kingdom and ECOMOG intervened with their own small, but professional, military forces, and the RUF was eventually crushed.

Arrest and charges 
Sankoh was later arrested on 17 May 2000 after his soldiers gunned down a number of protesters, killing 19 people, including journalist Saoman Conteh, outside his Freetown home on 8 May 2000. His arrest led to massive celebrations throughout Sierra Leone.

Sankoh was handed to the British. Under the jurisdiction of a UN-backed court, he was indicted on 17 counts for various war crimes, including use of child soldiers and crimes against humanity, including genocide, enslavement, rape and sexual slavery.

Death
Sankoh died in hospital of complications arising from a stroke whilst awaiting trial on the night of 29 July 2003. In a statement by the UN-backed war crimes court, chief prosecutor David Crane said that Sankoh's death granted him "a peaceful end that he denied to so many others".
He was buried in his hometown of Magbruka in the northern province of Sierra Leone.

References

External links
BBC obituary
Graphic Photos of Atrocities
Economist obituary

1937 births
2003 deaths
Sierra Leonean rebels
Sierra Leonean military personnel
Vice-presidents of Sierra Leone
People indicted by the Special Court for Sierra Leone
African warlords
Temne people
People from Tonkolili District
People of the Sierra Leone Civil War
Revolutionary United Front politicians
Heads of government who were later imprisoned
Sierra Leonean people who died in prison custody